Abdul Majid "Bachan" was a former Indian association football player who played as a forward for Mohammedan SC and the India football team. The Bachan Memorial Football Tournament, organised by the Cuttack District Athletic Association (CDAA) at Cuttack is held in his memory.

Club career
Bachan played for the Calcutta club Mohammedan SC and was the captain of the squad that won their 8th Calcutta Football League title in 1948. He was the top scorer of that season with 21 goals.

Bachan represented the Orissa state in the Santosh Trophy. He was part of the team which reached the semi-finals of the Santosh Trophy for the first time in the 1950–51 edition held at Calcutta.

International career
Bachan was part of the India national squad that played at the 1951 Asian Games.

Honours

India
Asian Games Gold medal: 1951

Mohammedan Sporting
Calcutta Football League: 1948

References

Indian footballers
People from Cuttack
Footballers from Odisha
Mohammedan SC (Kolkata) players
India international footballers
Footballers at the 1951 Asian Games
Medalists at the 1951 Asian Games
Asian Games medalists in football
Asian Games gold medalists for India
Association football forwards
Calcutta Football League players
Year of birth missing
Year of death missing